Nivaldo Batista Lima (born September 3, 1989), known by his stage name Gusttavo Lima, is a Brazilian singer, songwriter and record producer,one of the most influential names in Brazilian music. 
He is known in Brazil for his many hit songs,  and gained international prominence  through the song "Balada".

Lima started his career at the age of 7, with his elder brothers Willian and Marcelo, as a member of the Trio Remelexo. After leaving the trio, he went to the sertanejo duo Gustavo & Alessandro. In 2009, Lima released his debut solo studio album, which produced the successful song "Rosas, Versos e Vinhos", that topped regional radio charts and later entered in the Brasil Hot 100 Airplay. In 2010, the singer released his first live album, Inventor dos Amores, which produced three successful singles, "Inventor dos Amores", "Cor de Ouro" and "Refém". In 2011, the single "Balada", propelled Lima to national stardom. The song peaked at number 3 on Billboard Brazil Hot 100 Airplay, and also reached success in several countries such as Holland, Belgium, Spain, United States, France, Sweden, among others. "Balada" was include in his second live album Gusttavo Lima e Você (2011), which was certified platinum in Brazil. In 2012, the singer made his first international tour in the United States and in Europe. His third live album Ao Vivo in São Paulo (2012), which produced the single hit "Gatinha Assanhada", sold more than 200,000 copies and was certified double platinum.

In 2014, his second studio album Do Outro Lado da Moeda, had moderate commercial performance being certified gold in Brazil, however, the album produced the hit singles "Diz Pra Mim", "Fui Fiel", "Tô Solto na Night" and "10 Anos". In 2015, he released his fourth live album  Buteco do Gusttavo Lima, which featured several popular Brazilian artists performing popular songs of sertanejo music, as well as some songs from his own repertoire. His fifth live album 50/50 (2016), was one of his most successful albums, spawning the hit songs "Que Pena Que Acabou", "Homem de Família" and "Abre o Portão Que Eu Cheguei", with all topping the Brazil Hot 100 Airplay. In 2017, Lima released his sixth live album Buteco do Gusttavo Lima Vol. 2, featuring re-recordings and unpublished songs. Its lead single "Apelido Carinhoso" was a smash hit, topping the Brasil Hot 100 Airplay. In 2018, he released his seventh live album O Embaixador recorded at the Festa do Peão de Barretos, which alike his previous album featured unpublished songs and re-recordings, and its lead single "Zé da Recaída" was a smash hit, also topping the Brasil Hot 100 Airplay, his sixth song to top the chart.

Early life
Lima was born in Presidente Olegário, Minas Gerais state, the son of Sebastiana and Alcino Lima. In 1999, when he was just 9 years old, he went to Patos de Minas to sing with his brothers, who had a band called 'Trio Remelexo'. When he was 13 years old, he left the band and went to Brasília, where he changed his stage name to "Gusttavo" and assembled a duo called Gustavo & Alessandro.

Career

Musical career
In 2009, he released his first album Gusttavo Lima, containing 24 tracks. The song that most stood out was "Rosas, Versos e Vinhos", which reached the first position in a local radio, and it also reached #57 in Billboard Brasil charts. In 2010, he signed with Som Livre label and released Inventor dos Amores, as a CD and DVD, with sales of 15,000 copies. The title track was a collaboration with Jorge & Mateus, reaching #17 in the Brazilian Billboard Brasil charts. Based on this initial success, he released the single "Cor de Ouro" that reached #18 in Brazil. He also released "Refém", which reached #22 in charts.

In 2011, Gusttavo released CD and DVD titled Gusttavo Lima e Você which was recorded live in Patos de Minas, on June 3, 2011, during Fenamilho musical event with estimated audience of 6,000,000 people. The highly popular album reached #7 and was certified platinum. The album produced his definitive hit "Balada" (full title "Balada Boa (Tchê Tcherere Tchê Tchê) based on the famous refrain), which reached #3 in Brazil. The Brazilian football player Neymar played a similar role to that he played in Michel Teló's smash success "Ai se eu te pego!" and appeared in many shows with Gusttavo Lima.

In January 2012, he embarked on a first international tour with shows in US Latin markets in Florida, and later on in Atlanta (Georgia), Newark (New Jersey) and Revere (Massachusetts). Gusttavo released his hit single "Balada" in European markets following the steps of fellow Brazilian singer Michel Teló. He also released another live album in 2012 titled Ao vivo em São Paulo, on October 6, 2012 in Brazil

Discography

Albums
Studio albums

Live albums

EPs

Singles

Songs featured in

Other appearances

Other charting songs

Promotional songs

Discography: International charts
Albums

Singles

Filmography
2013: Amor à Vida (aka Rastros de Mentiras) as Gusttavo Lima (himself)

References

External links

1989 births
Living people
Musicians from Minas Gerais
21st-century Brazilian male singers
21st-century Brazilian singers
Sertanejo musicians
Sony Music Latin artists